Set Meal for Three (sān rén tào cān) is Singapore idol boy band Mi Lu Bing's third album. With a total of 11 songs, the album was released after months of production with their new recording label company, Dragon One Entertainment Group. The album consists of nine songs produced on their own and three songs that Nic sang for two different Mediacorp dramas. The composition for the first eight songs were all done by Mi Lu Bing themselves. Nic was also the assistant producer for the album.

Track listing 
 chī xià yŭzhòu (吃下宇宙, eat the universe)			
 yĭnshí nánnǚ (饮食男女, food and drink man and woman)
 méiqì de kĕlè (煤气的可乐, cooking gas cola)
 biàn zhuāng kafe (变装CAFE, cafe in disguise)
 lĕng wăncān (冷晚餐, cold evening meal)
 yànshízhèng (厌食症, anorexia)
 pĭncháng (品尝, taste)
 wàn. wèi (玩。味 play. flavour)
Bonus tracks
 zhōng huì yŏu	yī tiān (终会有一天 finally there'll be a day) (theme of nán xiōng làn dì《难兄烂弟》)
 xiăng	wò nĭ de shŏu (想握你的手 I want to hold your hand) (theme of TV show of same name《想握你的手》)
 zhĭ yào nĭ wēi xiào (只要你微笑 I only need your smile) (insert song from xiăng wò nĭ de shŏu《想握你的手》)

Songs on music charts

References

Mi Lu Bing albums
2007 albums